Málaga is a municipality of Spain, capital of the Province of Málaga, in the autonomous community of Andalusia. With a population of 578,460 in 2020, it is the second-most populous city in Andalusia and the sixth most populous in the country. It lies in Southern Iberia on the Costa del Sol ("Coast of the Sun") of the Mediterranean, primarily in the left bank of the Guadalhorce. The urban core originally developed in the space in between the Gibralfaro Hill and the Guadalmedina.

Málaga's history spans about 2,800 years, making it one of the oldest continuously inhabited cities in Western Europe. According to most scholars, it was founded about 770BC by the Phoenicians from Tyre as Malaka. From the 6th centuryBC the city was under the hegemony of Ancient Carthage, and from 218BC, it was under Roman rule, economically prospering owing to garum production. In the 8th century, after a period of Visigothic and Byzantine rule, it was placed under Islamic rule. In 1487, the Crown of Castile gained control in the midst of the Granada War. In the 19th century, the city underwent a period of industrialisation (in which the local Bourgeoisie thrived), followed by a decay in all socioeconomic parametres in the last third of the century.

The most important business sectors in Málaga are tourism, construction and technology services, but other sectors such as transportation and logistics are beginning to expand. Málaga has consolidated as tech hub, with companies mainly concentrated in the Málaga TechPark (Technology Park of Andalusia). It hosts the headquarters of the region's largest bank, Unicaja, and it is the fourth-ranking city in Spain in terms of economic activity behind Madrid, Barcelona and Valencia. Regarding transportation, Málaga is served by the Málaga–Costa del Sol Airport and the Port of Málaga, whereas the city is connected to the high-speed railway network since 2007.

History 

Phoenicians from Tyre founded a colony named Málaka or Malake about 770BC. The town controlled access to the Guadalmedina and served as a waypoint on trade routes between Phoenicia and the Strait of Gibraltar. Like other Phoenician colonies, it fell under Carthaginian rule during the 6th or 5th centuryBC. The Phoenician and Later Roman urban core developed around an area running from the Gibralfaro Hill to the mouth of the Malaca flumen (Guadalmedina).

After the Punic Wars, the Roman Republic took control of the town known to them as Malaca. By the 1st century BC, Strabo alluded to its Phoenician profile, in contrast to the hellenized characteristics of the neighbouring settlement of Mainake.

Transformed into a confederated city, it was under a special law, the Lex Flavia Malacitana. A Roman theatre was built at this time. After the fall of the Western Roman Empire, it was ruled first by the Visigoths. The city was taken circa 552 by the Byzantine Empire; either Malaca or Carthago Nova possibly then becoming the capital of the province of Spania. The Byzantines restored and expanded the docks, thus consolidating the fishing and trading tradition the city already enjoyed. The city was retaken by the Visigoth King Sisebuto in 615. The Islamic conquest of Málaga (rendered as —Mālaqah—in Arab sources) by Syrian Jund and Berber forces took place in 711 or perhaps 713. Following a period of diminished importance during the early stages of the emiral period already in force since before the conquest, Málaga was fully islamised by the end of the aforementioned period in the wake of Muhammad I's attributed intervention in the urban configuration as a medina.

The consolidation of the city's importance after 930 (under the Caliphate of Córdoba) ran parallel to the diminishing fortune of Archidona, the latter of which Málaga replaced as the capital of the corresponding kura of Rayya. The early 10th-century chronicle of Aḥmad al-Rāzī mentions the vineyards of Málaga, extolling the unparalleled quality of its raisins. In the 11th century, following the unravelling of Umayyad authority across the caliphate, Málaga became a centre of power of the Hammudids, who established a petty kingdom (nominally also a caliphate) in the city, the taifa of Málaga, complemented by the also Hammudid sister dominion in Ceuta across the Strait of Gibraltar. The city was seized away from the Hammudids by the Granadan Zirids in 1056 or 1057, and also underwent an ephemeral spell under the Sevillian Abbadids by 1066 before returning back to the former. By the late 11th century, the Zirids lost the city to the North-African Almoravids.

The traveller Ibn Battuta, who passed through around 1325, characterised it as "one of the largest and most beautiful towns of Andalusia [uniting] the conveniences of both sea and land, and... abundantly supplied with foodstuffs and fruits". He praised its grapes, figs, and almonds; "its ruby-coloured Murcian pomegranates have no equal in the world." Another exported product was its "excellent gilded pottery". The town's mosque was large and beautiful, with "exceptionally tall orange trees" in its courtyard.

After the formation of the Nasrid Kingdom of Granada in the 13th century, Málaga became a part of it. The export-oriented harbour traded silk fabrics, dry nuts (raisins, almonds and the famous Raiya figs, reportedly exported to as far as China), vine, cutlery, leather and the famous regional lustreware.

In the 15th century, Málaga was the main Nasrid port (followed by Almería), featuring a notable presence of Genoese merchants. It played a role both as stopover of the Atlantic international trade (as part of the routes connecting the Central Mediterranean to the North Atlantic) and as regional trading cog of the Kingdom of Granada. By the last rales of Nasrid rule, the city had a population of about 15,000.

Málaga was seized by Christian forces on 18 August 1487, after a 3-month 11 days siege, in what it was the most violent episode of the Granada War. The Muslim inhabitants resisted assaults and artillery bombardments before hunger forced them to surrender; practically the entire remaining population (around 11,000 people) became war captives and were sold into slavery in other Andalusian cities as well as Valencia and Barcelona. Only a minority of around 50 people led by merchant Alí Dordux were allowed to remain in the city.

The city was swiftly repopulated by Christian settlers coming from different locations of the Iberian Peninsula. Málaga became an exporting centre for Andalusia via the link of the city with Antequera and Córdoba, maintaining its trading character despite the nearly complete replacement of the population. The city did not escape a series of typhus fever outbreaks following its annexation to the Crown of Castile.

Following the death of regent Ferdinand the city rose in revolt in 1516 on the occasion of the installment of a new court controlled by the Admiral of Castile. It was only on 2 December 1530 when Málaga was freed from the influence of the Admiralty for good, confirming the privileges granted in the past by the Catholic Monarchs.

As of 1625, Málaga may have had a population of around 36,000.

On 24 August 1704 the indecisive Battle of Málaga, the largest naval battle in the War of the Spanish Succession, took place in the sea south of Málaga.

The city's economy profited from an early industrialisation in the first third of the 19th century and the population steadily increased until the last years of the century, when the population decreased between 1887 and 1897 due to  induced by the Phylloxera grapevine pest. The century saw the accumulation of capital in an enriched bourgeoisie class, that invested in the incipient industrial development.

The municipality of Málaga annexed the coastal town of Torremolinos in 1924.

After the coup of July 1936 the government of the Second Republic retained control of Málaga. Its harbour was a base of the Republican navy at the beginning of the Spanish Civil War. It suffered heavy bombing by Italian warships which took part in breaking the Republican navy's blockade of Nationalist-held Spanish Morocco and took part in naval bombardment of Republican-held Málaga. After the Battle of Málaga and the Francoist takeover in February 1937, over seven thousand people were killed, as they were trying to flee the city through the road to Almería.

Torremolinos—originally a small coastal town—greatly developed in the late 1950s and early 1960s, becoming an international tourist centre. The first gay bar in Spain was opened in Torremolinos in 1962 (and the first lesbian club in 1968), and the place acquired a lively LGBT life, to the point of being described as "the most 'cosmopolitan' and gay-friendly place in all of Spain". Nearly a decade after, in 1971, a policial crackdown seeking to curb "offences against public morality and decency" largely put an end to the appeal of the place, only regaining its status as hub of LGBT leisure and tourism after the death of the dictator.

Torremolinos became independent from the municipality of Málaga in September 1988.

Geography

Location

Málaga is located in the south of the Iberian Peninsula, on the Costa del Sol (Coast of the Sun) on the northern side of the Alboran Sea (the westernmost portion of the Mediterranean Sea).

The Montes de Málaga mountain range (part of the Penibaetic System) is located in the northeast of the municipality.

The city centre is located around the mouth of the Guadalmedina and close to the Guadalhorce's mouth (where the airport is located). The Totalán Creek constitutes the eastern boundary of Málaga with the municipality of Rincón de la Victoria.

Climate
Málaga's climate is subtropical-Mediterranean (Köppen climate classification: Csa) with very mild winters, during which most of the year's rainfall occurs, and hot summers with very little rainfall. Summer to mid-autumn tends to be fairly humid, due to the evaporation of warm water off the adjacent Mediterranean Sea being blown on shore by a sea breeze. This humidity is most pronounced at this time of year as the sea water is at its warmest in relation to the rest of the year and during this summer, to mid-autumn period, the apparent temperature often feels higher than the actual temperature would suggest, especially when the wind is light. When the wind is stronger, this effect is lessened somewhat, and the heat feels more manageable. Málaga enjoys plenty of sunshine throughout the year, with an average of about 300 days of sunshine and only about 40–45 with precipitation annually.

Málaga experiences the warmest winters of any European city with a population over 500,000. During the winter, the Málaga Mountains (Montes de Málaga) block the passage of cold winds from the north.

Large fluctuations in temperature are rare. In August 1881, the average reported daytime maximum temperature was a record . Snowfall is virtually unknown; since the beginning of the 20th century, Málaga city has only recorded snow on one day, on 2 February 1954.

Annual average relative humidity is 65%, ranging from 58% in June to 72% in December. Yearly sunshine hours average between 2,800 and 3,000 per year, from 5–6 hours of sunshine per day in December to average 11 hours of sunshine per day in July.

Atmospheric pressure averages from 1015 mbar in July and August to 1023 mbar in January. Visibility averages either 11 or 12 km in all months.

Subdivisions 
Málaga is divided into 11 municipal districts.

Main sights

The old historic centre of Málaga reaches the harbour to the south. In the north it is surrounded by mountains, the Montes de Málaga (part of the Baetic Cordillera) lying in the southern base of the Axarquía hills, and two rivers, the Guadalmedina – the historic center is located on its left bank – and the Guadalhorce, which flows west of the city into the Mediterranean, in the Churriana district.

The oldest architectural remains in the city are the walls of the Phoenician city, which are visible in the cellar of the Museo Picasso Málaga.

The Roman theatre of Málaga, which dates from the 1st century BC, was rediscovered in 1951.

The Moors left posterity the dominating presence of the Castle of Gibralfaro, which is connected to the Alcazaba, the lower fortress and royal residence. Both were built during the Taifa period (11th century) and extended during the Nasrid period (13th and 14th centuries). The Alcazaba stands on a hill within the city. Originally, it defended the city from the incursions of pirates. Later, in the 11th century, it was completely rebuilt by the Hammudid dynasty. Occupying the eastern hillside that rises from the sea and overlooks the city, the Alcazaba was surrounded by palms and pine trees.

Like many of the military fortifications that were constructed in Islamic Spain, the Alcazaba of Málaga featured a quadrangular plan. It was protected by an outer and inner wall, both supported by rectangular towers, between which a covered walkway led up the slope to the Gibralfaro (this was the only exchange between the two sites). Due to its rough and awkward hillside topography, corridors throughout the site provided a means of communications for administrative and defensive operations, also affording privacy to the palatial residential quarters.

The entrance of the complex featured a grand tower that led into a sophisticated double bent entrance. After passing through several gates, open yards with beautiful gardens of pine and eucalyptus trees, and the inner wall through the Puerta de Granada, one finds the 11th- and 14th-century Governor's palace. It was organised around a central rectangular courtyard with a triple-arched gateway and some of the rooms have been preserved to this day. An open 11th-century mirador (belvedere) to the south of this area affords views of the gardens and sea below. Measuring , this small structure highlighted scalloped, five-lobed arches. Directly beyond was the passage to the Gibralfaro above.

The Church of Santiago (Saint James) is an example of Gothic vernacular Mudéjar, the hybrid style that evolved after the Reconquista incorporating elements from both Christian and Islamic tradition. Also from the period is the Iglesia del Sagrario, which was built on the site of the old mosque immediately after the city fell to Christian troops. It boasts a richly ornamented portal in the Isabeline-Gothic style, unique in the city.

The Cathedral and the Episcopal Palace were planned with Renaissance architectural ideals but there was a shortfall of building funds and they were finished in Baroque style.

The Basílica y Real Santuario de Santa María de la Victoria, built in the late 17th century, has a chapel in which the vertical volume is filled with elaborate Baroque plasterwork.

Other sights include:
 Walls. Phoenician, Roman, Byzantine, Arab and Spanish remains of the defensive compounds of the city.
 Church of the Sacred Heart.
 San Felipe Neri Church.
 Church of the Holy Martyrs.
 La Concepción, botanical and historical garden.
 Atarazanas Market.
 Anglican Cemetery of St. George.
 Palm grove and Muelle Uno. Port of Málaga.
 San Miguel Cemetery.
 La Malagueta bullring.
 Pedregalejo, old fishing district.

Demographics

As of 2018, the population of Málaga is 571,026, accounting for 527,463 Spanish nationals and 43,563 foreign citizens.

The number of resident foreign nationals has risen significantly in Málaga since the 1970s.
 As of 2020, Málaga has a foreign population of 50,080.

Metropolitan area

It is formed by Málaga proper together with the following adjacent towns and municipalities: Rincón de la Victoria, Torremolinos, Benalmádena, Fuengirola, Alhaurín de la Torre, Mijas, Marbella and San Pedro Alcántara. The Málaga metropolitan area includes additional municipalities located mostly in the mountains area north of the coast and also some on the coast: Cártama, Pizarra, Coín, Monda, Ojén, Alhaurín el Grande and Estepona on west; Casabermeja on north; Totalán, Algarrobo, Torrox and Vélez-Málaga eastward from Málaga; centered Málaga urban area (Málaga, Rincón de la Victoria, Torremolinos, Benalmádena, Fuengirola, Marbella, Mijas) and Alhaurín de la Torre.

Together about 1.3 million (max. 1.6 million) people live in the Málaga metropolitan area and the number grows every year as all the municipalities and cities of the area record an annual increase in population.

Politics and administration

Málaga is a municipality, the basic local administrative division in Spain. The Ayuntamiento is the body charged with the municipal government and administration. The Plenary of the ayuntamiento is formed by 31 elected municipal councillors, who in turn invest the mayor. The last municipal election took place on 26 May 2019. The current mayor is Francisco de la Torre (People's Party), who has won several mandates since becoming mayor in 2000.

Economy

Málaga is the fourth-ranking city in economic activity in Spain behind Madrid, Barcelona and Valencia.

The most important business sectors in Málaga are tourism, construction and technology services, but other sectors such as transportation and logistics are beginning to expand. The Andalusia Technology Park (PTA) (In Spanish, "Parque Tecnológico de Andalucía"), located in Málaga, has enjoyed significant growth since its inauguration in 1992 by the King of Spain. In 2018, this high-tech, science and industrial park employs over 16,774 workers, according to its own numbers.

In line with the city's strategic plan, the campaign "Málaga: Open for Business" is directed towards the international promotion of the city on all levels but fundamentally on a business level. The campaign places a special emphasis on new technologies as well as innovation and research in order to promote the city as a reference and focal point for many global business initiatives and projects.

Málaga is a city of commerce and tourism has been a growing source of revenue, driven by the presence of a major airport, the improvement of communications, and new infrastructure such as the AVE and the maritime station, and new cultural facilities such as the Picasso Museum, the Contemporary Art Centre and Trade Fair and Congress, which have drawn more tourists.

The city hosts the International Association of Science and Technology Parks (IASP) (Asociación Internacional de Parques Tecnológicos), and a group of IT company executives and business leaders has launched an information sector initiative, Málaga Valley e-27, which seeks to make Málaga the Silicon Valley of Europe. Málaga has had strong growth in new technology industries, mainly located in the Technological Park of Andalusia, and in the construction sector. The city is home to the largest bank in Andalusia, Unicaja, and such local companies as Mayoral, Charanga, Sando, Vera, Ubago, Isofoton, Tedial, Novasoft, Grupo Vértice and Almeida viajes, and other multinationals such as Fujitsu Spain, Pernod Ricard Spain, Accenture, Epcos, Oracle Corporation, Huawei and San Miguel. In February 2021, Google decided to install a centre of excellence in cybersecurity in the city, slated for a 2023 opening. Also in 2021, Vodafone chose Málaga for the installment of a research, development and innovation centre.

Culture

Feasts and festivals
Holy Week

Holy Week has been observed for five centuries in Málaga. Processions start on Palm Sunday and continue until Easter Sunday. Famous is the royal archbrotherhood of Our-Lady of Hope Nuestra Señora de la Esperanza. They have more than 5,000 members and 600 . These tronos highlight the processions that go through the streets led by penitents dressed in long robes, with capirote, followed by women in black carrying candles. Drums and trumpets play music and occasionally someone spontaneously sings a mournful saeta dedicated to the floats as they make their way slowly round the streets. Some Holy Week tronos are so huge that they must be housed in places outside the churches, as they are taller than the entrance doors. Famous is the military procession of "la legion" (Royal congregation of Mena) playing marches and singing their anthem (El Novio de la Muerte) during procession.

Feria de Agosto

During the celebration of the Feria de Málaga in August, the streets are transformed into traditional symbols of Spanish culture and history, with sweet wine, tapas, and live flamenco shows. The day events consist of dancing, live music (such as flamenco or verdiales, traditional music from Málaga) and bullfights at La Malagueta, while the night fair is moved to the Recinto Ferial, consisting of restaurants, clubs, and an entire fair ground with rides and games.

Málaga Film Festival

The Málaga Film Festival (Festival de Málaga Cine Español; FMCE), dedicated exclusively to films produced in Spain, is one of the most important film festivals in the country. It is held annually during a week in March or April.

Other
The Fiesta Mayor de Verdiales takes place every year on 28 December during which Spain's April Fools’ Day is celebrated.

The Fiestas de Carnaval, in which people dress in all types of costumes, takes place prior to the holy 40 days of Lent every February. A contest is held in the Teatro Cervantes between groups of singers, quartets and choirs who compete in the singing of ironic songs about social and political issues. The Carnival takes to the streets of Málaga on the week before Ash Wednesday, ending on Malagueta beach with the burial of the anchovy (entierro de la sardina).

Gastronomy 

The cuisine of Málaga and the wider Costa del Sol is known for its espetos, fish (most often sardines) grilled over open fires in the chiringuitos located near the beaches. The espeto has been proposed as a candidate for designation by UNESCO as an intangible cultural heritage.

Religion
Most of the population of Málaga professes Roman Catholicism as its religion, although not many are practising Catholics. Protestants also have a presence in Málaga: one of seven congregations of the Reformed Churches in Spain is based in the city and is the only one that permits paedocommunion, while the Church of Jesus Christ of Latter-day Saints is growing.

Islam is represented by a growing number of immigrants and a mosque, while the Jewish community (primarily Sephardi) is represented by its synagogue and the Jewish Association.

Sports

Málaga is home to three major professional sports teams. These include:
 Málaga CF – football club plays in Segunda División. Honours: UEFA Intertoto Cup: 2002, UEFA Cup: 2003 (Quarter-finals), UEFA Champions League: 2013 (Quarter-finals).
 CB Málaga – basketball club plays in ACB League. Honours: Spanish Championship: 2006, runner-up: 1995, 2002; Spanish Cup: 2005, runner-up: 2009; Spanish Super-Cup: runner-up: 2006, 2015; Korać Cup: 2001, runner-up: 2000; Euroleague: third place: 2007; EuroCup: 2017
 CD El Palo – football club plays in third level of Spanish football: Segunda Division B
 Club Atlético Málaga – women's football club plays in Superliga Femenina, Honours: Spain Cup: 1998, runner-up: 1997; Spain Supercup: 1999

The city has four large sports facilities:
 Estadio La Rosaleda – football stadium, with a capacity of 30,044. One of the arenas of Segunda División (for Málaga CF) and 1982 FIFA World Cup. Final of UEFA Intertoto Cup 2002.
 Jose Maria Martin Carpena Arena – sports arena, with a maximum capacity of 14,000. It is home of CB Málaga and arena of Spanish Cup 2001, 2007, 2014; Spanish Super-Cup 2004, 2006, 2015; NBA Europe Live Tour 2007;
 Estadio de Atletismo Ciudad de Málaga – athletics stadium with a capacity of 7,500. Place where the European Cup 2006 was celebrated; 2006 Vuelta a España; Spain Athletics Championships 2005 and 2011;
 Centro Acuático de Málaga (Málaga Aquatic Centre) – water arena, with a capacity of 17,000. Arena of European Water Polo Championship 2008.

In the city, people can engage in many sports, for example: surfing, windsurfing, kitesurfing, swimming, diving, skydiving, paragliding, running, cycling, rowing, tennis and golf.

The city hosted the 21st World Transplant Games from 25 June to 2 July 2017.

Málaga is the 2020 EU Sports Capital.

Tourism

The city is an important tourist destination, known as "the capital of the Costa del Sol". An estimated 6 million tourists visit the city each year. Tourists usually visit the birthplace of Pablo Picasso and the Museo Picasso Málaga, the Carmen Thyssen Museum, the old town or the beaches. The Málaga harbour is also the second busiest cruise port of the Iberian Peninsula.

A popular walk leads up the hill to the Gibralfaro castle (a Parador), offering panoramic views over the city. The castle is next to the Alcazaba, the old Muslim palace, which in turn is next to the inner city of Málaga. Other nearby attractions are the Roman Theatre, the old Jewish quarter, the cathedral, and the Church of Santiago in mudéjar style. A popular walk follows the Paseo del Parque (a promenade that runs alongside a grand park with many palm trees and statues) to the harbour, ending in Calle Larios, the main commercial street of the city. There is also a curious museum, the Museum of the Holy Week, which includes an impressive display of Baroque ecclesiastical items.

Museums

In the early part of the 21st century, the city of Málaga invested heavily (more than 100 million euros in 10 years) in the arts to draw tourists and establish itself as a cultural Andalucia destination with 28 museums.

Education

Bilingual education in schools
Since the launch of the 'Plan de Fomento del Plurilingüismo' in 2005, 169 schools in Málaga have included bilingual education in their programmes. Although English is the most usual second language, many other primary and secondary schools in Málaga offer the choice of French, German, Arabic, Portuguese or Chinese. This first action has been followed by a second project run by the Junta de Andalucia. The so-called "Plan Estratégico de Desarrollo de las Lenguas en Andalucía" intends to provide pupils with a basic level (B1) of at least one foreign language.

Artistic training
Dance, music, drama, visual arts and crafts also have a place in the public education system of Málaga. Some of the most relevant artistic schools are:
 Escuela de Arte San Telmo: Arts and Crafts, vocational and high-school education.
 Conservatorio Profesional de Musica Manuel Carra: music, vocational training.
 Conservatorio Profesional de Danza de Málaga: dance, vocational training.
 Conservatorio Superior de Música de Málaga: Bachelor and Master level.
 Escuela Superior de Artes Escénicas de Málaga (Bachelor and Master level).

Spanish as a foreign language
Málaga has become one of the leading destinations for Spanish courses. In 2017, 16,692 students visited Málaga to enroll in Spanish courses, 17.6% more than 2016.

Universities in Málaga

The public University of Málaga (UMA) was created in 1972. Earlier in the 20th-century a branch of the University of Granada (a Faculty of Economic and Business Sciences) had been opened in the city in 1963. As of 2012 the UMA had 35,354 students.

The campus of the UMA is located in the Western neighbourhood of Teatinos. There are 13 different faculties, namely: Fine Arts, Science, Communication, Education, Health Sciences, Economic and Business Sciences, Business and Management, Law, Social Work and Studies, Humanities, Medicine, Psychology, and Tourism. In addition there are 5 higher technical schools, the Higher Polytechnic School, the Higher Technical School of Architecture, the Higher Technical School of Telecommunication Engineering, the Higher Technical School of Industrial Engineering and the Higher Technical School of Computer Engineering.

International schools in Málaga city
 British School, Málaga (British school)
 Lycée Français de Málaga (French school)
 Swedish School in Málaga

Transport

Airport

The city is served by Málaga-Costa del Sol Airport, one of the first in Spain and the oldest still in operation. In 2008, it handled 12,813,472 passengers, making it the fourth-busiest in Spain. It is the international airport of Andalusia, accounting for 85 percent of its international traffic.
The airport, connected to the Costa del Sol, has a daily link with twenty cities in Spain and over a hundred cities in Europe (mainly in the United Kingdom, Central Europe and the Nordic countries but also the main cities of Eastern Europe: Moscow, Saint Petersburg, Budapest, Sofia, Warsaw or Bucharest), North Africa, Middle East (Riyadh, Jeddah and Kuwait) and North America (New York City, Toronto and Montreal).

The airport is connected to the city centre and surrounding areas through a transport hub, which includes the bus system and suburban trains and car parks.

Seaport

The Port of Málaga is the city's seaport, operating continuously at least since 600 BC. The port is one of the busiest ports on the Mediterranean Sea, with a trade volume of over 428,623 TEU and 642,529 passenger in 2008.

The port has a ferry connection to the Port of Melilla, playing a role in the so-called  ("Operation Pass of the Strait"), the planned seasonal transit of passengers during the summer months from Europe to North-Africa (and back to Europe).

High-speed train

The Málaga María Zambrano railway station is served by the AVE high-speed rail system, and is operated by the state-owned rail company Renfe.

Roads and highways
The A45 road leads north to Antequera and Córdoba.
The Autovía A-7 parallels the N-340 road, both leading to Cádiz to the west through the Costa del Sol Occidental and Barcelona to the east through the Costa del Sol Oriental.

Public transportation 

Urban bus
Empresa Malagueña de Transportes buses are the main form of transport around the city. Málaga's bus station is connected with the city by the bus line number 4, although it is only ten minutes' walk to the Alameda from there.

Metropolitan bus
The buses of the Málaga Metropolitan Transport Consortium (Consorcio de Transporte Metropolitano del Área de Málaga) are the main mean of transportation around the city of Málaga and the surrounding municipalities.

Mass transit
The city has two commuter train lines Cercanías departing from the Centro-Alameda station and a light metro system.

Málaga Public Transportation statistics
The average amount of time people spend commuting with public transit in Málaga, for example to and from work, on a weekday is 49 min. 6% of public transit riders, ride for more than 2 hours every day. The average amount of time people wait at a stop or station for public transit is 9 min, while 8% of riders wait for over 20 minutes on average every day. The average distance people usually ride in a single trip with public transit is 4.1 km, while 1% travel for over 12 km in a single direction.

Notable people

 Solomon ibn Gabirol (1021–1058), philosopher and poet
 Ibn al-Baitar (1188–1248), botanist and pharmacist
 Ruy López de Villalobos (1500–1544), explorer
 Diego de Montemayor (1530–1611), founder of Monterrey, Mexico and governor of Nuevo León
 Francisco de Leiva (1630–1676), playwright
 Luis de Unzaga (1721–1790), politician
 Bernardo de Gálvez (1746–1786), Count of Gálvez and Viscount of Galveston, military and colonial administrator
 María Manuela Kirkpatrick (1794–1879), aristocrat
 José de Salamanca (1811–1883), Marquis of Salamanca and Count of Los Llanos, businessman and politician
 Antonio Cánovas del Castillo (1828–1897), Prime Minister of Alfonso XII
 José Denis Belgrano (1844–1917), painter
 José Moreno Carbonero (1858–1942), painter
 Pablo Picasso (1881–1973), artist
 José Moreno Villa (1887–1955), painter and writer
 María Dávila (1990–), painter
 Bernardo Giner de los Ríos (1888–1970), architect and politician
 Victoria Kent (1898–1987), lawyer and politician
 Luis Bolín (1894–1969), lawyer and journalist
 Emilio Prados (1899–1962), poet
 Manuel Altolaguirre (1905–1959), poet
 Antonio Molina (1928–1992), singer
 Jesus Franco (1930–2013), film director and musician 
 Chiquito de la Calzada (1932–2017), comedian
 Antonio Luque (1941–), engineer and photovoltaics pioneer
 Juan Madrid (1943–), writer and journalist
 Pepe Romero (1944–), classical and flamenco guitarist
 Dani Rovira (1980–), comedian and actor
 Marisol or Pepa Flores (1948–), singer and actress
 Amparo Muñoz (1954–2011), Miss Universe Spain 1974, Miss Universe 1974
 Jorge Rando (1941–), artist
 Antonio Banderas (1960–), actor
 Miguel Ángel Jiménez (1964–), professional golfer
 Carlos Álvarez (1966–), baritone
 Antonio de la Torre (1968–), actor
 María del Mar Rodríguez Carnero, La Mari (1975–), singer
 Juan García Postigo (1981–), Mister World 2007
 Azahara Muñoz (1987–), professional golfer
 Ana López Rodríguez, Anni B Sweet (1987–), singer
 Pablo Alborán (1989–), singer
 Vanesa Martín (1980–), singer
 Joe Atlan (1989–), musician
 Isco Alarcón (1992–), footballer
 Miguel Herrán (1996–), actor
 Miguel de Miguel (1975–), actor

Twin towns and sister cities

Málaga is twinned with:

 Mobile (United States); since 23 February 1965.
 Popayán (Colombia); since October 1979.
 Passau (Germany); since September 1987.
 Tyre (Lebanon); since 2016.  
 Zacatecas (Mexico); since 17 June 1988.

See also

 Malaga (wine)

References

Informational notes

Citations

Sources
 
 
 
 
 The Alhambra from the Ninth Century to Yusuf I (1354). vol. 1. Saqi Books, 1997.
 Guia Viva, Andalucia, Anaya Touring Club, April 2001.
 
 .

External links

 Department of Tourism of Malaga
 Malaga official website

 
Municipalities in the Province of Málaga
Populated places of the Byzantine Empire
Phoenician colonies in Spain
Historic Jewish communities
Mediterranean port cities and towns in Spain
Archaeological sites in Spain
Roman sites in Spain
Tourism in Spain
Populated coastal places in Spain
8th-century BC establishments in Europe